The 1994 Rosmalen Grass Court Championships, also known as Continental Grass Court Championships for sponsorship reasons, was a men's ATP-tennis tournament held in Rosmalen, Netherlands. The event was part of the World Series of the 1994 ATP Tour It was the fifth edition of the tournament and was played on outdoor grass courts and held from 6 June through 13 June 1994. Richard Krajicek won his second title of the year, and sixth of his career.

Finals

Singles

 Richard Krajicek defeated  Karsten Braasch, 6–3, 6–4

Doubles

 Stephen Noteboom /  Fernon Wibier defeated  Diego Nargiso /  Peter Nyborg, 6–3, 1–6, 7–6

References

External links
 ITF – tournament edition details
 

Rosmalen Grass Court Championships
Ordina Open
Rosmalen Grass Court Championships